The Governour of Cyprus (or The Governor of Cyprus) is a 1703 play by the English writer John Oldmixon. It premiered at the Lincoln's Inn Fields Theatre in London, but the exact date was unclear with some sources putting the first performance in December 1702.

The original cast included George Powell as Phorsano, Barton Booth as Virotto, Thomas Betterton as Iopano,  Elizabeth Barry as Issamenea and Elizabeth Bowman as Lucinda.

References

Bibliography
 Burling, William J. A Checklist of New Plays and Entertainments on the London Stage, 1700-1737. Fairleigh Dickinson Univ Press, 1992.
 Nicoll, Allardyce. History of English Drama, 1660-1900, Volume 2. Cambridge University Press, 2009.

1703 plays
English plays
West End plays
Tragedy plays